Meteor (foaled 1839) was a British Thoroughbred racehorse who won the 2000 Guineas Stakes in 1842. He was owned by John Bowes and trained by John Scott.

Background
Meteor was a chestnut colt foaled in 1839. He was sired by York Gold Cup and Liverpool Cup winner Velocipede, who sired a number of top runners including Epsom Derby winner Amato. Meteor's dam, Dido, was a daughter of Derby winner Whisker. He grew to stand 15 hands and 3 inches high.

Racing career
Meteor stated as the 6/4 favourite for the 2000 Guineas Stakes at Newmarket on 26 April 1842. Ridden by William Scott, Meteor won the race by half a length from Wiseacre. Misdeal finished in third with Archy in fourth place of the eight runners. In July at Goodwood he finished unplaced behind Misdeal in the Racing Stakes over a mile, after starting as 6/4 favourite. He was kept in training as a four-year-old, but was never fit enough to race. These two races were his only appearances and he earned £1,500.

Stud career
Meteor was a stallion at Catterick in Yorkshire. He stood for a fee of five guineas and five shillings for the groom. He died sometime after 1861 (when he appeared for sale).

Pedigree

References

1839 racehorse births
Racehorses bred in the United Kingdom
Racehorses trained in the United Kingdom
Thoroughbred family 2-c
2000 Guineas winners